Nancy Louise Swider-Peltz (born August 20, 1956, in Chicago, Illinois) was an Olympic speedskater (1976, 1980, 1984, 1988) from the United States who held the world record in the 3,000 meters in 1976.  She was the first U.S. Olympian to compete in four different Winter Olympics.  She was elected to the National Speed Skating Hall of Fame.

She is a graduate of Maine South High School in Park Ridge, Illinois.

Swider-Peltz coaches her daughter, Nancy Jr., who competed for the US at the 2010 Winter Olympics.

She is also a graduate of Wheaton College, Wheaton, Illinois.
She now coaches at Park Ridge Speedskating Club.

References
Sports-Reference bio

Living people
1956 births
American female speed skaters
Olympic speed skaters of the United States
Speed skaters at the 1976 Winter Olympics
Speed skaters at the 1980 Winter Olympics
Speed skaters at the 1984 Winter Olympics
Speed skaters at the 1988 Winter Olympics
Speed skaters from Chicago
Sportspeople from Wheaton, Illinois
Sportspeople from Park Ridge, Illinois
Wheaton College (Illinois) alumni
World record setters in speed skating
21st-century American women